Nathan Dossantos (born April 11, 1999) is a Canadian professional soccer player who plays as a defender for Pittsburgh Riverhounds in the USL Championship.

Early years 
Growing up in Oakville, Ontario, Dossantos attended Garth Webb Secondary School. He playing club soccer with Dixie SC, before later moving to the Toronto FC Academy in 2014. In 2015, Dossantos moved to Woodbridge Strikers, winning the U18 Ontario Cup Championship in 2015 and 2016. After two seasons, he joined Sigma FC, playing for the under-20s and under-23s as well as making five appearances for the senior team in League1 Ontario.

College career 
Dossantos played four seasons of college soccer between 2018 and 2021 while majoring in political science. In 2018, he joined Duquesne Dukes of the Atlantic 10 Conference, starting all 16 matches as a freshman and scoring one goal. As a sophomore, Dossantos once again started all 17 games, playing every minute of every game except for 18 minutes of a 2–0 defeat to Cleveland State.

Ahead of the 2020 season, Dossantos transferred to Marshall Thundering Herd of Conference USA. With the season delayed until spring 2021 because of the COVID-19 pandemic, he became an immediate contributor, starting in 17 of 18 appearances during the season as Marshall allowed eight goals and kept a team record 11 shutouts on the way to the regular season conference title. As a result, the team received an automatic bid to the 2020 NCAA Division I Men's Soccer Tournament. Despite entering unseeded, they beat #23 ranked Fordham, #1 Clemson, defending national champion #8 Georgetown and North Carolina to set up a final appearance against #3 Indiana. Marshall won their first NCAA National Championship in program history with a 1–0 overtime victory. Dossantos played every minute in all five games, scoring a penalty in the shootout victory over Clemson, and was named to the 2020 NCAA All-Tournament Team. He had already received 2020 All-Conference USA First Team honors. As a senior in 2021, Dossantos started all 18 matches and led the team in minutes played with 1,690. He became the first player in program history to win conference Defensive Player of the Year. In total, Dossantos finished his collegiate career with 68 starts in 69 appearances, scoring two goals and two assists.

During the 2019 college offseason, Dossantos played for Seattle Sounders U23 in USL League Two, making 10 appearances. In the 2021 offseason, he returned to USL League Two with FC Florida U23, playing in two games.

Club career

Pittsburgh Riverhounds 
On January 11, 2022, Dossantos was selected in the second round (46th overall) of the 2022 MLS SuperDraft by Orlando City. He spent preseason with Orlando but was unsigned, eventually signing with USL Championship team Pittsburgh Riverhounds on a one-year contract with a club option year on February 18, 2022. He made his debut on March 12, 2022, as a 68th-minute substitute in 3–0 win over Memphis 901.

On December 8, 2022 it was announced that the Riverhounds exercised their option on Dossantos' contract in order to make him a part of the teams 2023 roster.

International career 
In March 2014, Dossantos was called-up to a 34-player Canada under-15 identification camp.

Career statistics

College

Club

Honors 
Marshall Thundering Herd
Conference USA regular season: 2020
NCAA National Championship: 2020

Individual
Conference USA Defensive Player of the Year: 2021

References

External links 
 Nathan Dossantos at Marshall Thundering Herd
 

1999 births
Living people
Association football defenders
Canadian expatriate sportspeople in the United States
Canadian soccer players
Duquesne Dukes men's soccer players
Expatriate soccer players in the United States
League1 Ontario players
Marshall Thundering Herd men's soccer players
Orlando City SC draft picks
Pittsburgh Riverhounds SC players
Seattle Sounders FC U-23 players
Sigma FC players
Soccer people from Ontario
Sportspeople from Oakville, Ontario
Treasure Coast Tritons players
USL Championship players
USL League Two players
Woodbridge Strikers players